Dali Mpofu (born Christopher Daluxolo Mpofu in 1962 in King William's  Town) is a South African lawyer and politician who is the former National Chairperson of the Economic Freedom Fighters and has been serving on the party's central command team since 2013.

Early life
Mpofu began practicing law after he completed his LLB at the University of South Africa in 1991. He joined the Youth League of the African National Congress (ANC) in 1989 during apartheid. In a letter penned by Winnie Mandela, she admitted to giving Dali Mpofu R160 000 (worth over R700 000 in 2019 terms) of misappropriated ANC funds.

Career 
In 2014, he left the ANC after 33 years and joined Julius Malema's opposition party, the Economic Freedom Fighters.

In 2017, Mpofu was elected to serve a term on the South African Judicial Service Commission (JSC). In 2019, he was re-elected for a second term.  His term came to an end in 2021, but he was allowed to continue ‘to keep the continuity and not disrupt the proceedings of the JSC’.

In 2021 Mpofu represented Tom Moyane in the Zondo commission into state capture and told the former Public Enterprises Minister Pravin Gordhan to "shut up".  The Johannesburg Society of Advocates subsequently found Mpofu in breach of ethics for telling his colleague Michelle le Roux to shut up during this exchange.

Dali Mpofu represented Jacob Zuma in a number of appeals and postponement applications during his corruption trial, but has denied that these form part of a "Stalingrad legal defense" which has delayed the case by over two decades. 

Dali Mpofu represented Public Protector Busisiwe Mkhwebane in her application to interdict Parliament and Cyril Ramaphosa from dismissing her.  A report by a parliamentary panel said there was "substantial information that constitutes prima facie evidence of incompetence".  Dali Mpofu said suspending Mkhwebane would be "injurious to [her] reputation, dignity and self-worth".

Personal life 
Dali Mpofu married Mpumi Nxumalo in 2004.

References

Living people
1962 births
South African politicians
20th-century South African lawyers
21st-century South African lawyers